Godfrey of Cambrai (also known as Godfrey of Winchester) was the prior of Winchester Abbey from 1082 until his death in 1107. When he joined the Benedictine community around 1070 he was probably around 15 years old. He also was a composer of poems, writing ecclesiastics and eulogies of English kings, and a book of moral epigrams in the style of Martial. Godfrey's genuine works were later often confused with those of Martial's.

His work enjoyed considerable popularity in the century after his death and beyond. One of his poems is included in Carmina Burana. Twenty-one manuscripts of his works survive.

He was popular, under his own name and erroneously under Martial's, during the Italian Renaissance.

References

Thomson, Rodney M., 'England and the Twelfth Century Renaissance', Past and Present 101 (1983)
Oxford Dictionary of National Biography

11th-century births
1107 deaths
11th-century English clergy
12th-century English Roman Catholic priests
Priors
Year of birth unknown
English satirists
Epigrammatists
Medieval Latin poets
English male poets
12th-century English poets
12th-century English writers
11th-century English poets
11th-century English writers
11th-century Latin writers
12th-century Latin writers